The 2021 Belgian Cup Final, named Croky Cup after the sponsor, was the 66th Belgian Cup final. On 13 March 2021, Standard Liège qualified for their 18th final, losing 9 and winning 8. Genk qualified one day later, reaching their sixth final, winning all but one, namely their latest appearance when they lost the 2018 Belgian Cup Final to Standard Liège. It took place on 25 April 2021 and was won by Genk.

Route to the final

Match

Summary
In an empty King Baudouin Stadium, both teams started the match eagerly. Genk came close to an early goal, with a shot by Kristian Thorstvedt hitting the post and a first serious warning for Standard Liège. Standard Liège, who had been relying on their fighting spirit throughout the season, lacked sharpness and creativity in the final third of the pitch. At the back, however, they did manage to keep control of the ball and kept Genk at bay after the initial challenge by Thorstvedt. During the 1st half, Théo Bongonda and poacher Paul Onuachu were firmly in the defense's grip.

At the start of the second half, the game split open, when Hugo Siquet lost the ball, Genk immediately sent it to Junya Ito, who left Arnaud Bodart without a chance with a crossed shot. The goal gave Genk confidence and the Limburg team gradually took more and more control of the match. Although Genk was the better team, they still had to watch their backs. The Genk defense had a hard time dealing with the excellent substitute Jackson Muleka, who had the equalizer at his feet, but his shot was a miss. As the game progressed, Standard was forced to take more risks, allowing more space for Genk. Ten minutes before the end of the game, Bongonda took advantage of this to slide in the 0-2. Muleka immediately brought the excitement back with a strong header, but Genk survived the final offensive, winning their 5th Belgian Cup and being assured of European football for the coming season.

Details

Notes

References

External links
  

Belgian Cup finals
Cup Final
Belgian Cup Final
Sports competitions in Brussels
Belgian Cup Final
Standard Liège matches
K.R.C. Genk matches